Secretary for Social Affairs and Budget was a member of the government of Portuguese Macau. The Secretary headed the Secretariat is responsible for the health and social affairs in the colony.

The department was assigned to the Secretariat for Social Affairs and Culture and budgetary powers to the Secretariat for Economy and Finance.

Organisational structure 
 Health Bureau
 Social Welfare Bureau

List of Secretariats

 Alarcão Troni (董樂勤)

References
 Casa de Macau - references to former Portuguese secretaries

Social Affairs and Budget
Government departments and agencies of Macau
Political office-holders in Macau
Positions of the Macau Government